Pecos is the largest city in and the county seat of Reeves County, Texas, United States. It is in the valley on the west bank of the Pecos River at the eastern edge of the Chihuahuan Desert, in the Trans-Pecos region of West Texas and just south of New Mexico's border. Its population was 12,916 at the 2020 census. On January 24, 2012, Pecos City appeared on the Forbes 400 as the second-fastest growing small town in the United States. The city is a regional commercial center for ranching, oil and gas production, and agriculture. The city is most recognized for its association with the local cultivation of cantaloupes. Pecos claims to be the site of the world's first rodeo on July 4, 1883.

History

Pecos is one of the numerous towns in West Texas organized around a train depot during the construction of the Texas and Pacific Railway. These towns were subsequently linked by the construction of U.S. Highway 80 and Interstate 20. Prior to the arrival of the railroad, a permanent camp existed nearby where cattle drives crossed the Pecos River. With the introduction of irrigation from underground aquifers, the city became a center of commerce for extensive local agricultural production of cotton, onions, and cantaloupes. The introduction of large-scale sulfur mining in adjacent Culberson County during the 1960s led to significant economic and population growth. The growth was reversed after mining operations ceased in the 1990s.

In 1962, Pecos resident and tycoon Billie Sol Estes was indicted for fraud by a federal grand jury. Estes' extensive machinations caused a national-level scandal, resulting in a shakeup at the Department of Agriculture. Oscar Griffin, Jr., of the Pecos Independent and Enterprise newspaper won a Pulitzer Prize for breaking the story.

Pecos is the site of the largest private prison in the world, the Reeves County Detention Complex, operated by the GEO Group.

Geography

Demographics

2020 census

As of the 2020 United States census, 12,916 people, 2,729 households, and 1,857 families resided in the city.

2000 census
As of the census of 2000,  9,501 people, 3,168 households, and 2,455 families were residing in the city. The population density was 1,300.1 people per square mile (501.8/km). The 3,681 housing units averaged 503.7 per mi2 (194.4/km). The racial makeup of the city was 76.322% White, 2.45% African American, 0.46% Native American, 0.47% Asian,  18.07% from other races, and 22% from two or more races. Hispanics or Latinos of any race were 79.57% of the population.

Of the 3,168 households,  39.9% had children under 18 living with them, 59.0% were married couples living together, 14.9% had a female householder with no husband present, and 22.5% were not families. About 20.4% of all households were made up of individuals, and 9.6% had someone living alone who was 65 or older. The average household size was 2.97, and the average family size was 3.47.

In the city, the age distribution was 32.5% under 18, 8.7% from 18 to 24, 24.2% from 25 to 44, 21.7% from 45 to 64, and 13.0% who were 65 or older. The median age was 33 years. For every 100 females, there were 93.3 males. For every 100 females age 18 and over, there were 89.0 males.

The median income for a household in the city was $24,943, and for a family was $26,376. Males had a median income of $25,867 versus $13,874 for females. The per capita income for the city was $11,857. About 23.4% of families and 27.1% of the population were below the poverty line, including 36.0% of those under 18 and 15.6% of those 65 or over.

Education

The City of Pecos is served by the Pecos-Barstow-Toyah Independent School District, which currently has five schools:
Pecos Kindergarten, Austin Elementary (grades 1–3), Bessie Haynes Elementary (grades 4–5), Crockett Middle School, (grades 6–8), and Pecos High School (grades 9–12).

Climate
Pecos experiences a semiarid (BSk) to desert climate (BWh) with hot summers and mild winters. The city's aridity results in a substantial diurnal temperature variation, resulting in cool nights even after hot summer days.

Notable people

 Billie Sol Estes, financier convicted of fraud
 Paul Gonzales, boxer, gold medalist at the 1984 Summer Olympic Games
 Oscar Griffin, Jr., recipient of 1963 Pulitzer Prize for Investigative Reporting
 Roger Mobley, later child actor, resided in Pecos in the 1950s
 Abel Talamantez, singer of Menudo and the Kumbia Kings

References

External links

 Pecos, Texas – Official Site
 
 Pecos Area Chamber of Commerce

 
Cities in Reeves County, Texas
Cities in Texas
County seats in Texas
Micropolitan areas of Texas